Frank Jelinski (born 23 May 1958 in Bad Münder am Deister) is a retired German racing driver.

Career
After karting, Jelinski moved to the German Formula Three Championship in 1978 and European Formula Super Vee in 1979 finishing 4th. In 1980 he won the German F3 championship and finished 13th in the European championship. He repeated his German F3 championship in 1981. He moved to Formula Two in 1982 and finished 12th. In 1983 he made 4 F2 starts and began a transition to sports cars that would last the rest of his career. In 1984 he made 6 World Sportscar Championship starts and two DTM starts. He captured his first World Sportscar Championship win in 1986 driving for Brun Motorsport and moved to Joest Racing in 1987. He continued with Joest until the 1991 24 Hours of Daytona, which he won with teammates Hurley Haywood, "John Winter", Henri Pescarolo, and Bob Wollek. He moved to DTM full-time that year driving an AZR Audi to 10th in points. He retired from full-time racing in 1992, but returned for the 24 Hours of Le Mans every year until 1995, and has since occasionally come out of retirement for one-off appearances.

Racing record

Complete European Formula Two Championship results
(key)

24 Hours of Le Mans results

Complete Deutsche Tourenwagen Meisterschaft results
(key) (Races in bold indicate pole position; races in italics indicate fastest lap.)

References

External links
Frank Jelinski at Driver Database
Frank Jelinski photos at The Motor-Racing Picture Collection

1958 births
German racing drivers
German Formula Three Championship drivers
European Formula Two Championship drivers
FIA European Formula 3 Championship drivers
24 Hours of Le Mans drivers
Deutsche Tourenwagen Masters drivers
24 Hours of Daytona drivers
Living people
World Sportscar Championship drivers
24 Hours of Spa drivers
People from Hameln-Pyrmont

Audi Sport drivers
Team Joest drivers
Nürburgring 24 Hours drivers